Debra Fox is the founder and CEO of Fox Learning Systems. She was previously a television reporter and anchor with WTAE-TV Pittsburgh (1976–1986).

WTAE television career 
Fox was named "Best Pittsburgh Newscaster" seven years in a row by the Pittsburgh Tribune Review. During her ten-year television career, she was able to interview many prominent national figures such as Presidents Gerald Ford, Jimmy Carter (during the Iran Hostage Crisis), Ronald Reagan, George H. W. Bush, Governor Michael Dukakis, Senator Ted Kennedy, Senator Joe Biden, Reverend Jesse Jackson, Walter Mondale and Gary Hart. She also covered the 1984 Democratic National Convention in San Francisco. After having her first child in 1986, she retired from WTAE.

The Golden Land 
In 1990, Fox took over for Wolf Blitzer in PBS's series "The Golden Land". This was a documentary about the history of Israel in the context of the Israeli-Palestinian Conflict

Fox Learning Systems 
In 1997, Debra founded Fox Learning Systems after personally experiencing problems in the long-term care industry. Using her on-camera experiences, Fox set out to produce software and educational material that makes eldercare staff training fun and exciting. Fox has started her own blog that talks about the many troubles dealing with the elder care industry

Notable appearances 
2009: Seton Hill E-Magnify "Build A World-Class Business" Conference, Keynote Speaker 
2008: Rite Aid and Fox Learning Systems team up together to launch Rite Aid “Giving Care For Parents” using Fox’s educational video training
2008: Pittsburgh magazine featured article on Debra Fox Improving Eldercare through Education
2004: Feature article in E-Magnify a Seton Hill publication 
2003: Keynote speaker for National Women’s Leadership conference held in Pittsburgh
2002: Speaker at the MIT forum, Pittsburgh chapter
2000: Feature Article in the Pittsburgh Post-Gazette speaking about the focus of Fox Learning Systems.
1991: Acted as a television news reporter in the TV Movie The 10 Million Dollar Getaway

Awards 
2007: Acceptance and successful completion of the National Institutes of Health Commercialization Assistance Program
2006: National Winner of the American Association of Geriatric Psychiatry's Images of Aging Communications Award
2005: Inducted into the National Association of Women’s Presidents Organization
2004: Winner of the 50 Best Women in Business Award for Pennsylvania

References

External links 
Fox Learning Systems Website
WTAE Website
Debra's Information

Mass media in Pittsburgh
Journalists from Pennsylvania
Living people
American women journalists
Year of birth missing (living people)
21st-century American women